The Aber Mawr Formation is a geological formation in Wales. It preserves fossils dating back to the Arenig Series of the Ordovician period.

See also 
 List of fossiliferous stratigraphic units in Wales

References

External links 
 

Geologic formations of Wales
Ordovician System of Europe
Ordovician Wales
Floian
Tremadocian
Mudstone formations
Tuff formations